Grand Superior terroir in the village of Noszvaj which is located in the Eger wine region, in Central Europe, Hungary. The Eger region has a cooler climate, which is similar to Burgundy or to the Northern Rhône wine regions. The continental climate and diverse soils make it capable of producing both red and white varietals.

The terroir 
This terroir consists mainly of granite and volcanic soils with south-southwesterly exposure. Blessed with a unique microclimate due to Lake Bogács, this site has soils rich in minerals that result in distinctive, fresh and fruity wines.

The Nyilas-már terroir is almost exclusively in the possession of the Kovács NImród Winery (KNW). KNW has 8 hectares (20 acres) in Nyilas-már.

Varietals of the terroir include: Chardonnay, Pinot Gris, Pinot Noir, Syrah and Kékfrankos.

References 

Wine regions of Hungary